Saddle Pals is a 1947 American Western film directed by Lesley Selander and written by Robert Creighton Williams and Jerry Sackheim. The film stars Gene Autry, Lynne Roberts, Sterling Holloway, Irving Bacon, Damian O'Flynn and Charles Arnt. The film was released on June 6, 1947, by Republic Pictures.

Plot

Cast 
Gene Autry as Gene Autry
Lynne Roberts as Shelly Brooks
Sterling Holloway as Waldo T. Brooks Jr.
Irving Bacon as Thaddeus 
Damian O'Flynn as Bradford Collins
Charles Arnt as William Schooler
Jean Van as Robin Brooks
Tom London as Dad Gardner
Charles Williams as Leslie
Francis McDonald as Sheriff
George Chandler as Pickpocket Dippy
Edward Gargan as Jailer
The Cass County Boys as The Three Singing Ranchhands

References

External links 
 

1947 films
1940s English-language films
Republic Pictures films
American Western (genre) films
1947 Western (genre) films
Films directed by Lesley Selander
American black-and-white films
1940s American films